The 2015 Vuelta a Castilla y León was the 30th edition of the Vuelta a Castilla y León cycling stage race. It started on 17 April in Ávila and ended on 19 April on the climb of Alto de Lubián, after three stages. The race was part of the 2015 UCI Europe Tour, and was rated as a 2.1 event. The defending champion was David Belda.

The race was won by Pierre Rolland, who won a solo victory on the summit finish on the final stage. The  riders Beñat Intxausti and Igor Antón were second and third.

Teams 
17 teams were invited to take part in the race. One of these was a UCI WorldTeam; three were UCI Professional Continental teams; twelve were UCI Continental teams. The final team was a Spanish national team of track cyclists.

Schedule

Stages

Stage 1 
17 April 2015 – Ávila to Alba de Tormes,

Stage 2 
18 April 2015 – Guarda (Portugal) to Fuentes de Oñoro,

Stage 3 
19 April 2015 – Zamora to Alto de Lubián,

Classification leadership table

References

Sources

External links 
 

Vuelta a Castilla y León by year
Vuelta a Castilla y Leon
Vuelta a Castilla y Leon